Fossa jugularis may refer to:

 Jugular fossa (fossa jugularis ossis temporalis)
 Suprasternal notch (fossa jugularis sterni)